A world war is an armed conflict involving many nations. 

World war may also refer to:
World War I (1914–18)
World War II (1939–45)
World War III, a discussed future possible conflict

Arts and entertainment
"World War" (The Cure song)
The World Wars (miniseries), a History Channel series
Worldwar, a series of novels by Harry Turtledove

See also
The War of the Worlds, a novel by H. G. Wells
World at War (disambiguation)